was a  after Jingo-keiun and before Ten'ō. This period spanned the years from October 770 through January 781.

Change of era
 770 : The new era name was created to mark an event or series of events. The previous era ended and the new one commenced in Jingo-keiun  4, on the 18th day of the 8th month of 770.

Events of the Hōki era
 23 October 770 (Hōki 1, 1st day of the 10th month): The era name was changed to mark the beginning of Emperor Konin's reign.
 778 (Hōki 9): The emperor granted Kashima-jinja a divine seal for use on documents.
 28 August 779 (Hōki 10, 7th month): Fujiwara no Momokawa died at age 48.
 781 (Hōki 12, 4th month ): The emperor abdicated in favor of his son, who would later come to be known as Emperor Kanmu. Emperor Kōnin's reign had lasted for 11 years.
 781 (Hōki 12, 12th month): Kōnin died at the age of 73.

Notes

References
 Brown, Delmer M. and Ichirō Ishida, eds. (1979).  Gukanshō: The Future and the Past. Berkeley: University of California Press. ;  OCLC 251325323
 Nussbaum, Louis-Frédéric and Käthe Roth. (2005).  Japan encyclopedia. Cambridge: Harvard University Press. ;  OCLC 58053128
 Ponsonby-Fane, Richard Arthur Brabazon. (1963). The Vicissitudes of Shinto. Kyoto: Ponsonby Memorial Society. 
 Titsingh, Isaac. (1834). Nihon Ōdai Ichiran; ou,  Annales des empereurs du Japon.  Paris: Royal Asiatic Society, Oriental Translation Fund of Great Britain and Ireland. OCLC 5850691
 Varley, H. Paul. (1980). A Chronicle of Gods and Sovereigns: Jinnō Shōtōki of Kitabatake Chikafusa. New York: Columbia University Press. ;  OCLC 6042764

External links
 National Diet Library, "The Japanese Calendar" -- historical overview plus illustrative images from library's collection

Japanese eras
8th century in Japan
770 beginnings
781 endings